Mount Saviour Monastery is a historic farm and monastery campus within a national historic district located near Pine City, Chemung County, New York.

It encompasses 10 contributing buildings and 3 contributing sites on a working farm in continuous operation since 1865.  The monastery was founded in 1950 and the property is owned by the Benedictine Foundation of New York State.  Located on the property are the contributing Our Lady Queen of Peace Chapel (1953) and East and West Buildings (1964), St. Joseph's House (1954-1957), St. Peter's House (Former Nagel/Hofbauer House, 1874), St. Gertrude's House (Former Durmstadt House, 1865), Mount Saviour Monastic Cemetery (1960), Good Shepherd Lay Cemetery (1955), St. Peter's Barn (Former Nagel/Hofbauer Barn, c.1890/1942), Main barn (1959), Arts & Crafts Building & Storage (Former Shop Building and Kiln, 1962/1973), Wagner House (Former Neilitz House, 1879), St. James's House (Former Harding House, 1870), and Annex (Former milk house and now monastery guest house, 1870/1961).

It was added to the National Register of Historic Places in 2015.

The Monastery of Christ in the Desert in Abiquiú, New Mexico developed from Mount Saviour in 1964.

References

External links
Abbey website

Benedictine monasteries in the United States
Historic districts on the National Register of Historic Places in New York (state)
Properties of religious function on the National Register of Historic Places in New York (state)
1950 establishments in New York (state)
Gothic Revival architecture in New York (state)
Italianate architecture in New York (state)
Buildings and structures in Chemung County, New York
National Register of Historic Places in Chemung County, New York
Italianate church buildings in the United States